Erdberg may refer to:

 Erdberg, Vienna, a neighbourhood
 Erdberg (Vienna U-Bahn), a station on line U3
 Erdberg, the German name of the Czech village of Hrádek (Znojmo District)